The Maksim Gorkiy is a Maksim Gorkiy-class (Q-040) Soviet/Russian river cruise ship, cruising in the Volga – Neva basin. The ship was built by Österreichische Schiffswerften AG at their shipyard in Korneuburg, Austria, and entered service in 1974. Maksim Gorkiy is the most comfortable river cruise ship currently in service with Vodohod. Her sister ship is Aleksandr Pushkin. Her home port is currently Nizhny Novgorod.

See also
 List of river cruise ships

References

External links

 Motorship “Maxim Gorky” (type Q-040) 

1974 ships
River cruise ships
Maxim Gorky